Red Oaks is an American comedy-drama streaming television series created by Joe Gangemi and Gregory Jacobs. The first season was released on Amazon Prime Video on October 9, 2015. On December 18, 2015, Amazon announced that the show would be returning for a second season in 2016. The second season was released on November 11, 2016. On January 30, 2017, Amazon announced that the series was renewed for a third and final season, which was released on October 20, 2017.

Plot
David, a college student, begins working at  Red Oaks, a Jewish country club in New Jersey during his summer break in 1985. The show follows David's life, with numerous subplots including his family, friends, and coworkers, and primarily revolves around the club. The show explores themes such as adolescence, relationships, socioeconomic mobility, and the pursuit of happiness in a mostly comedic fashion against the backdrop of the New York–New Jersey area in the 1980s.

Cast

Main

Recurring

Episodes

Season 1

Season 2

Season 3

Production
For his role as Nash, Ennis Esmer read with director David Gordon Green in both his regular voice and what The New York Times describes as "an invented accent he calls 'Indo Middle Eastern British'", while trying to get Green to laugh. Esmer used a vocal coach to improve the accent and continued using it while on the set.

Filming
The main filming location is Edgewood Country Club in River Vale, New Jersey. Additional locations include Florence Park in Mamaroneck, New York, Willow Ridge Country Club in Westchester County, New York, and Paris, France.

Critical reception
Red Oaks has received mostly positive reviews. On review aggregator site Rotten Tomatoes, it holds a score of 81%, an average rating of 7.8/10, based on 26 reviews. The website's consensus reads: "Red Oaks offers an affectionate nod to 1980s sex comedies that – largely thanks to a talented ensemble cast – finds fresh humor in its familiar premise." Metacritic gives the show a score of 70 out of 100, sampled from 21 reviews, signifying "generally favorable reviews".

Entertainment Weekly gave the pilot a B+, and singled out Esmer's performance:

The New York Times enjoyed the pilot:

Newsday liked it as well:

References

External links

2010s American comedy-drama television series
2014 American television series debuts
2017 American television series endings
Amazon Prime Video original programming
Fiction about body swapping
Fictional clubs
English-language television shows
Television series by Amazon Studios
Television shows filmed in New Jersey
Television shows filmed in New York (state)
Television series set in the 1980s